John Burnet, FBA (9 December 1863 – 26 May 1928) was a Scottish classicist. He was born in Edinburgh and died in St Andrews.

Life and work
Burnet was educated at the Royal High School, Edinburgh, the University of Edinburgh, and at Balliol College, Oxford, where he obtained first-class honours in Classical Moderations (Greek and Latin) in 1885 and in Literae Humaniores ('Greats', a combination of philosophy and ancient history) in 1887.  In the course of his undergraduate academic career at Oxford he won the Taylorian Scholarship in French (1885) and came second for the Boden Sanskrit Scholarship (1884)

After taking his degree in 1887 Burnet became an assistant to Lewis Campbell at the University of St. Andrews. He was a master at Harrow School in 1888. From 1890 to 1915, he was a Fellow at Merton College, Oxford; and from 1892 to 1926 a professor of Greek at St Andrews. For a term prior to his St Andrews professorship, he served as Interim Professor of Humanity (Latin) at the University of Edinburgh. He became a Fellow of the British Academy in 1916.  In 1909, Burnet was offered, but did not accept, the Chair of Greek at Harvard University. He was Sather Professor in Classical Literature, California, 1925.

In 1894, he married Mary Farmer, the daughter of John Farmer, who wrote the Preface for a collection of essays published after his death, Essays and Addresses.

Burnet is best known for his work on Plato.  His interest in philosophy and in Plato in particular seems to have begun during his service as assistant to Lewis Campbell at St. Andrews.  Burnet was known for defending novel interpretations of Plato and Socrates, particularly the view that the depiction of Socrates in all of Plato's dialogues is historically accurate, and that the philosophical views peculiar to Plato himself are to be found only in the so-called late dialogues.  Burnet also maintained that Socrates was closely connected to the early Greek philosophical tradition, now generally known as Pre-Socratic philosophy; Burnet believed that Socrates had been in his youth the disciple of Archelaus, a member of the Anaxagorean tradition (Burnet 1924, vi).

Burnet's philological work on Plato is still widely read, and his editions have been considered authoritative for 100 years, as the 5-volume Oxford Classical Texts critical edition of Plato works and spuria (1900–1907).  His commentaries on Plato's Euthyphro, Apology, and Crito and on the Phaedo also remain widely used and respected by scholars. Myles Burnyeat, for example, calls Burnet's Plato: Euthyphro, Apology of Socrates, Crito "the still unsurpassed edition". S.R. Slings, editor of the new 2003 Oxford Classical Texts edition of Plato's Republic, described Burnet as "a superb editor, with a feeling for Platonic Greek that is unlikely to be ever surpassed."

Early Greek Philosophy

Early Greek Philosophy is a book by John Burnet. Four editions were published by A. & C. Black, Ltd. in Great Britain. The first edition was published in April 1892, the second in June 1908, the third in September 1920 and the fourth, posthumously, in 1930.

From the Preface to the Third Edition (unchanged in the fourth edition):...the main thesis of my book, and the vital point of the argument is my insistence on the derivation of Atomism (which is admittedly materialistic) from Eleaticism, in accordance with the express statements of Aristotle and Theophrastos...There are many differences between the first and fourth editions. For example, the quotation below comes from section 33: Philosophy as a life. in the first (1892) edition. In the third (1920) and fourth (1930) editions, the section has been moved to section 35, renamed to Philosophy as a way of life. and no longer mentions the Neoplatonists .

John Burnet noted in his 1892 publication Early Greek Philosophy

The Neoplatonists were quite justified in regarding themselves as the spiritual heirs of Pythagoras; and, in their hands, philosophy ceased to exist as such, and became theology. And this tendency was at work all along; hardly a single Greek philosopher was wholly uninfluenced by it. Perhaps Aristotle might seem to be an exception; but it is probable that, if we still possessed a few such "exoteric" works as the Protreptikos in their entirety, we should find that the enthusiastic words in which he speaks of the "blessed life" in the Metaphysics and in the Ethics (Nicomachean Ethics) were less isolated outbursts of feeling than they appear now. In later days, Apollonios of Tyana showed in practice what this sort of thing must ultimately lead to. The theurgy and thaumaturgy of the late Greek schools were only the fruit of the seed sown by the generation which immediately preceded the Persian War.

Legacy
The University of St Andrews hall was named in his honour John Burnet Hall.

Bibliography

Major works
Early Greek Philosophy. London and Edinburgh: A. and C. Black, 1892. 2nd edition, 1908. 3rd edition, 1920. 4th edition, 1930.
 An online text of the 3rd edition (1920) of Early Greek Philosophy
re-edited 5th edition, 2015.
Early Greek Philosophy (1892, Archive.org)
Greek Philosophy: Thales to Plato. London, MacMillan, 1914.
re-edited 2nd edition, 2010.
Platonism.  Berkeley: University of California Press, 1928.
Higher Education and the War, 1917.
Essays and Addresses, 1930, includes a "Memoir" by Godfrey Rathbone Benson.
"The Socratic Doctrine of the Soul", 1916. (British Academy's 1916 Philosophical Lecture).
"Aristotle", 1924. (British Academy's 1924 Master-Mind Lecture).

Editions edited and annotated by Burnet
The Ethics of Aristotle.  London: Methuen, 1900.  PDF
Platonis Opera: Recognovit Brevique Adnotatione Critica Instruxit (as Ioannes Burnet). Oxford: Oxford Classical Texts, 1900–1907.
Plato: Phaedo. Oxford: Clarendon, 1911.
Plato: Euthyphro, Apology of Socrates, Crito. Oxford: Clarendon, 1924.

References

Further reading
The Dictionary of British Classicists, ed. Robert Todd, Bristol: Thoemmes Continuum, 2004.

External links

 
 
 John Burnet, Early Greek Philosophy, online text: 
Aristotle on Education, being extracts from the Ethics and Politics (1903)
The Socratic Doctrine of the Soul British Academy Lecture (1916)
Greek Rudiments (1918), second edition (2014), a textbook on diction and idiom of the Attic dialect.
Greek Philosophy, an essay published in The Legacy of Greece (1921)

1863 births
1928 deaths
People educated at the Royal High School, Edinburgh
Alumni of the University of Edinburgh
Alumni of Balliol College, Oxford
Scottish classical scholars
British scholars of ancient Greek philosophy
Fellows of the British Academy
Fellows of Merton College, Oxford